Zoë Yadira Saldaña-Perego (born June 19, 1978) is an American actress. Known primarily for her work in science fiction film franchises, she has appeared in all three of the highest-grossing films of all time (Avatar, Avatar: The Way of Water and Avengers: Endgame), a feat not achieved by any other performer. Films she has appeared in have grossed more than  worldwide and, as of 2023, she is the second-highest-grossing film actress, and the fourth actor overall.

A trained dancer, Saldaña began her acting career in two 1999 episodes of Law & Order. Her first film role was in Center Stage (2000) in which she played a ballet dancer. She received early recognition for her work opposite Britney Spears in the road film Crossroads (2002). Beginning in 2009, Saldaña achieved a career breakthrough with her roles as Nyota Uhura in the Star Trek film series and Neytiri in James Cameron's Avatar film series. She portrayed Gamora in the Marvel Cinematic Universe, beginning with Guardians of the Galaxy (2014). In addition to such franchise work, Saldaña has starred in the science fiction film The Adam Project and the romantic drama miniseries From Scratch, both for Netflix in 2022.

Early life
Saldaña was born on June 19, 1978, in Passaic, New Jersey Her parents were Aridio Saldaña, who was Dominican, and Asalia Nazario, of Puerto Rican descent. Nazario was living as a child with her mother in the Dominican Republic, but they migrated to New York to escape political unrest.

In an interview with Wired, Saldaña has said that she is Dominican and Puerto Rican.

She and her two sisters, Cisely and Mariel, were raised bilingual in English and Spanish; the latter was their first language at home. The majority of her early childhood was spent in Jackson Heights, Queens, New York City. 

Their father died in a vehicle crash when Saldaña was nine. Her mother sent the three sisters to the Dominican Republic to be raised by their late father's family. She stayed in New York to work in order to afford private school for the girls. The widowed mother Asalia married Dagoberto Galán, who became the stepfather of the girls. They consider him fully their father.  

With regard to her racial identity, Saldaña has said, "There's no one way to be Black. I'm Black the way I know how to be."

Saldaña discovered her love of dance while living in the Dominican Republic. She was enrolled in the ECOS Espacio de Danza Academy studying forms of dance, but describes ballet as her passion. She told Vanity Fair that she quit ballet because she did not "have the feet", and had too much pride and ambition to just be in the corps de ballet. 

The family returned to New York City after her sophomore year; she completed her early education at Newtown High School in Queens.

In 1995, Saldaña performed with the Faces theater group in Brooklyn. She appeared in plays that encouraged teens by exploring such issues as substance abuse and adolescent sex. During these years, she performed with the New York Youth Theater; her appearance in their production of Joseph and the Amazing Technicolor Dreamcoat led a talent agency to recruit her. Her dance training and her acting experience helped her land her first film role, playing ballet student Eva Rodriguez in Center Stage (2000).

Career

Beginnings

Saldaña was a member of Faces after her exposure in an episode of Law & Order (titled "Refuge, Part 2") in 1999. Saldaña's first film role was in Center Stage (2000), directed by Nicholas Hytner, about dancers at the fictitious American Ballet Academy in New York city. She appeared in the Britney Spears vehicle Crossroads (2002). The film earned negative reviews from critics, but was a box-office success. Saldaña starred in the comedy-drama Drumline (2002), alongside Nick Cannon, earning mixed reviews.

In Pirates of the Caribbean: The Curse of the Black Pearl (2003), she played Anamaria, a pirate joining Will Turner and Mr. Gibbs for a chance to confront Jack Sparrow for stealing her ship. She appeared in The Terminal as Dolores Torres, an immigration officer and Star Trek fan, a role helping Saldaña during her portrayal in the Star Trek reboot (2009). In 2004, she had roles in Haven and Temptation; both earned little-to-no box-office success.

In 2005, Saldaña appeared in Constellation, Guess Who with Ashton Kutcher, and Dirty Deeds. She starred in the romantic comedy-dramas Premium (2006) and After Sex (2007). Saldaña starred in Blackout, a television film set in New York city during the Northeast Blackout of 2003. The film premiered at the 2007 Zurich Film Festival and debuted on BET in 2008. Saldaña had a supporting role as Angie Jones in the action thriller Vantage Point (2008).

Breakthrough: Franchise roles 

Saldaña appeared in two roles in 2009, raising her profile considerably. She played Nyota Uhura in Star Trek. The film's director J. J. Abrams asked Saldaña to play the role because he enjoyed her work. She met with Nichelle Nichols to understand the creation of Uhura's background and name of the character. Saldaña's mother was a Star Trek fan, leaving voice-mails during filming, advising on the role. Steven Spielberg taught her the Vulcan salute five years earlier while he directed her in The Terminal. Star Trek (2009) was a box-office success earning $385.7 million.

Saldaña's second high-profile film in 2009 was James Cameron's Avatar portraying the indigenous hunter Neytiri. Avatar was well received by critics, accumulating an approval rating of 83% on the review aggregator Rotten Tomatoes. It grossed $2.7 billion worldwide to become the highest-grossing film of all time, as well as in the United States and Canada. It also became the first film to gross more than $2 billion worldwide. The film was nominated for ten Saturn Awards, and won all ten at the 36th Saturn Awards ceremony. Saldaña's Saturn Award for Best Actress win marked a rare occurrence for an all-CG character.

In 2010, Saldaña performed in The Losers as Aisha al-Fadhil, a native Bolivian woman. For the role, she was required to gain weight to carry weapons for eight hours a day. In 2010, she appeared in Takers, Death at a Funeral, and Burning Palms. Her television ad for Calvin Klein's "Envy" line debuted in 2010. In 2011, Saldaña starred in the romantic comedy The Heart Specialist, and portrayed assassin Cataleya Restrepo in the crime drama Colombiana. Although the latter film earned negative reviews from critics, Saldaña's performance was praised.

In 2012, she appeared in the romantic drama The Words, earning negative reviews from critics with little success at the box-office.

In 2013, Saldaña reprised her role as Uhura in Star Trek Into Darkness, the sequel to the Star Trek re-boot. Like the previous film, it was a box-office success, ending its North American theatre run with a box office total of $228,778,661, placing it as the eleventh-highest-grossing film of 2013. It earned $467,365,246 worldwide, ranking it in 14th place for 2013, and making it the highest-grossing film of the franchise.  Saldaña voiced her character in the 2013 release of the Star Trek video game.

In 2014, Saldaña played Gamora in the hit Guardians of the Galaxy. Saldaña portrayed the Gamora character with make-up rather than computer generated imagery (CGI) or performance capture. The film became the third-highest-grossing film in the Marvel Cinematic Universe, behind The Avengers and Iron Man 3. It was the third-highest-grossing 2014 film (behind Transformers: Age of Extinction and The Hobbit: The Battle of the Five Armies), and the highest-grossing superhero film of 2014.

The film earned positive reviews. Saldaña was nominated for numerous awards including Critics' Choice Movie Award for Best Actress in an Action Movie, Favorite Action Movie Actress at the People's Choice Awards, and Best On-Screen Transformation at the MTV Movie Awards.

In May 2014, she performed in Rosemary's Baby, a television adaptation of Ira Levin's horror novel. Saldaña also co-produced the four-hour two-part show.
In 2014, Saldaña was recognized by Elle magazine during The Women in Hollywood Awards, honoring women for achievements in film, spanning all aspects of the motion-picture industry, including acting, directing, and producing.

2016–present
Saldaña starred in Nina, an unauthorized biography about the jazz musician Nina Simone released in April 2016. The film depicts the late singer's rise to fame and relationship with her manager Clifton Henderson. Simone's family were critical of the decision to cast her in the role. In August 2020, Saldaña apologized for taking on the role, saying "I'm so sorry. I know better today and I'm never going to do that again. She's one of our giants and someone else should step up. Somebody else should tell her story." In 2016, she co-starred in the science-fiction sequel Star Trek Beyond released in July, and Ben Affleck's crime drama Live by Night released in December.

Saldaña returned as Gamora in the Guardians of the Galaxy sequel, Guardians of the Galaxy Vol. 2, released in May 2017. She reprised the role in Avengers: Infinity War (2018) and its sequel Avengers: Endgame released in April 2019.

Also in 2017, Saldaña played Mrs. Mollé in I Kill Giants, Anders Walter's adaptation of Joe Kelly's graphic novel I Kill Giants. Shooting commenced in Ireland in September 2016. Also that year, she appeared in My Little Pony: The Movie performing the voice of pirate parrot Captain Celaeno.

On May 3, 2018, she received a star at 6920 Hollywood Boulevard in the Motion Pictures section of the Hollywood Walk of Fame.

In 2021, Saldaña starred in two roles made by Netflix, appearing as Rosita in the film musical Vivo and stars as the titular character in Maya and the Three. She joined an all-star cast in David O. Russell's Amsterdam.

Saldaña reprised her role as Neytiri in the sequel Avatar: The Way of Water, released in December 2022, including attending the premiere in Los Angeles on December 12, 2022. As part of her role, she performed vocals for the original song "The Songcord" on the film's soundtrack, penned by Simon Franglen. She is returning as Neytiri for the sequel Avatar 3, to be released in 2024, as well. She will also star in the Paramount+ television series Lioness, created by Taylor Sheridan.

Personal life

In June 2010, Saldaña was engaged to her longtime boyfriend Keith Britton, an actor and the CEO of My Fashion Database. In November 2011, she and Britton announced they had ended their relationship after eleven years.

Saldaña was in a relationship with actor Bradley Cooper from December 2011 to January 2013.

In March 2013, Saldaña began dating Italian artist Marco Perego. They married in June 2013 in London. In July 2015, Saldaña revealed Perego adopted her surname upon marriage. Thereafter, Zoë became Zoë Saldaña-Perego and Marco became Marco Perego-Saldaña. Their children would be Perego-Saldaña. Saldaña and Perego have three sons, twins born in November 2014 and the third born in February 2017. Saldaña has stated her children will be multi-lingual because she and her husband speak Spanish, Italian and English around them.

In July 2016, during an interview with Net-a-Porter's The Edit, Saldaña revealed she has Hashimoto's thyroiditis, an autoimmune disease, along with her mother and sisters. To combat the effects of this disease, Saldaña said she and her husband adhere to a gluten- and dairy-free diet.

Saldaña is a supporter of FINCA International, a micro-finance organization.

Saldaña is left-handed. In 2015, during International Left-Handers Day, she tweeted in support of the Left-Handers Movement.

In 2017, Saldaña founded BESE, a digital media platform designed to "combat the lack of diversity in the mainstream media" with an interest on positive stories within the Latino community. In September 2020, Saldaña used her social media presence to participate in the VoteRiders #IDCheck Challenge to help spread the word about voter ID requirements for that year's presidential election.

Filmography

Film

Television

Video games

Theme park attractions

Awards and nominations

References

External links

 
 
 

1978 births
20th-century American actresses
21st-century American actresses
Actresses from New Jersey
Actresses from New York City
African-American actresses
African-American ballet dancers
American actresses of Puerto Rican descent
American female dancers
American film actresses
American people of Dominican Republic descent
American stage actresses
American television actresses
American video game actresses
American voice actresses
Dancers from New York (state)
Hispanic and Latino American actresses
Hispanic and Latino American dancers
Living people
Motion capture actresses
Newtown High School alumni
People from Passaic, New Jersey
People from Queens, New York
20th-century African-American women
20th-century African-American people
21st-century African-American women